The Nevado del Quindío is an inactive volcano located in the Central Cordillera of the Andes in central Colombia. The summit marks the tripoint of the departments of Risaralda, Quindío and Tolima, and is also the highest point of the departments of Risaralda and Quindío. The mountain is one of the highest peaks in the Los Nevados National Natural Park, which is a wildlife sanctuary. There are no historical records of any eruption. The andesitic volcano is located on top of the Palestina Fault.

The snow fields and glaciers in the mountain are decreasing in a progressive way, about ten percent annually since the first scientific measures in the late 1980s, presumably because of global warming.

The mountain offers beautiful landscapes, attracting touristic visits all the year. The lower part is a cloud forest habitat, rich in endemic species.

Botanist and naturalist Alexander von Humboldt visited the area in 1801, describing new species such as the frailejón.

In popular culture 
The postal service of Colombia, AdPostal, released a postal stamp featuring the Nevado del Quindío and Von Humboldt, to celebrate the anniversary of his visit. It is a stratovolcano or composite volcano, evidenced by geological studies.

A watercolor painting of the volcano by Manuel María Paz (1820–1902) is held by the National Library of Colombia.

Panorama

See also 
 List of volcanoes in Colombia
 List of volcanoes by elevation

References

Bibliography

External links 
  Parque Nacional Natural los Nevados website
  
 

Mountains of Colombia
Volcanoes of Colombia
Glaciers of Colombia
Andean Volcanic Belt
Geography of Risaralda Department
Geography of Quindío Department
Geography of Tolima Department
Four-thousanders of the Andes